The Art of Doing Nothing is the fourth solo studio album from Take That band member and singer-songwriter Mark Owen. The album was released on 7 June 2013 in Germany and 10 June 2013 in the UK, eight years since the release of his third studio album, How the Mighty Fall. The album was produced by Charlie Russell and Bradley Spence, with additional production on two tracks by Starsmith. The album was preceded by the release of the lead single "Stars", and debuted at number 29 on the UK Albums Chart, making it his highest-charting album in the United Kingdom. It sold 6,360 copies in the UK.

Background
In March 2012, The Sun reported that Owen was planning to re-launch his solo career and that he had been putting together new material. It was reported in June 2012 that Owen had recorded a number of electronic tracks and was toying with the idea of including different genres within the same project; it was also report that he had been working with producer Starsmith, who had previously worked with the likes of Ellie Goulding and Cheryl Cole. In October 2012, Owen previewed the recording of the album during the ninth series of The X Factor, inviting bandmate Gary Barlow and his category of contestants along to the recording studio to watch him making final touches to the album.

In March 2013, further details of the album emerged, including the album title, "The Art of Doing Nothing" and the conformation that Owen had recorded the majority of the album in his garden shed studio, known as the "rabbit hutch". The album was then mixed in New York at the Electric Lady Studios by Michael Brauer, Charlie Russell, Ben Mark and Jamie Norton. He confirmed the album would feature a collaboration with singer-songwriter Ren Harvieu along with production from Alt-J producer Charlie Russell. A source said, "Mark is really excited about the album—he sees it more as a collaborative work than a solo album, something he made with a collection of his friends. He's worked with some really interesting people on it including Ren Harvieu and Charlie Russell, the producer who has worked with Alt-J, as well as some brilliant illustrators, photographers, and film makers. People will be surprised by the results—it's not what fans will expect."

Owen said of the album title, "It's called The Art of Doing Nothing. It's like a project. The name came about because when anybody asks me what I'm up to, I say 'nothing', so now I'm calling it "The Art of Doing Nothing". On 1 May 2013, Owen uploaded new photographs and videos to his official website, including the deluxe album artwork, which depicts Mark in a white room, scribbling on the wall, while wearing a dapper hat. A tagline to accompany the artwork reads: "Every idea has a starting place. Nothing begins in an empty space." The two videos consist of a montage video, picturing the photo-shoot that shot the album cover and the second, which is a short interview with Owen, in which he discusses the album's contents and cover.

Reception
The album received positive reviews, especially for the single "Stars" and "S.A.D.". Heather Maloney of Examiner.com described the album as "an amazing work of art". Robert Copsey from Digital Spy wrote: "For an artist often perceived to be bashful, the results are surprisingly compelling."

Singles
 "Stars" was released as the lead single from the album on 3 May 2013. The single premiered on BBC Radio 2 on the Ken Bruce show, before the music video was released later that afternoon. The video depicts Owen in an astronaut suit, walking around a city center, in a shopping mall, and dancing at a disco, all while trying to escape from the suit.

Track listing
The standard edition of the album contains ten tracks, while the deluxe contains an extra three. A super-deluxe boxset, containing a fifteen track album, five art prints (one of which is signed and limited to just fifty copies), and a headed notepad with the Mark Owen logo on, is available from Owen's official store.

Personnel

Solá Akingbolá - Percussion
Alexander Beitzke - Engineer, Programming
Mark Bengston - Assistant
Michael H. Brauer - Mixing
Lucy Butler - Prop Stylist, Set Stylist
Fin Dow-Smith - Composer
Jason Elliott - Engineer
Jake Emlyn - Composer, Featured Artist, Vocals
Steph Fraser - background vocals
Brendan Collins (a.k.a. Futurebound) - Remixing
Ryan Gilligan - Assistant
Jon Green - Guitar, Keyboards, background vocals
Isobel Griffiths - Orchestra Contractor
Ren Harvieu - Featured Artist, Vocals
Andy Hughes - Engineer
Lucy Jules - background vocals
Graham Kearns - Guitar, background vocals
Dougal Lott - Engineer
Bob Ludwig - Mastering
Will Malone - Brass Arrangement, String Arrangements
Ben Mark - Composer, Guitar, Ukulele, background vocals
Jamie Quinn (a.k.a. Matrix) - Remixing
Charlotte Matthews - Assistant Contractor
Jamie Norton - Composer, Keyboards, Piano, background vocals
Mark Owen - Composer, Vocals
Martin Owen - French Horn
Camilla Pay - Harp
Perou - Photography
Charlie Russell - Engineer, Producer, Programming
Ash Soan - Drums
Bradley Spence - Engineer, Producer, Programming
Starsmith - Additional Production, Keyboards, Producer, Programming
Mark "Spike" Stent - Mixing
Paul Turner - Bass
Tom Upex - Engineer

Charts

Release history

References

Mark Owen albums
2013 albums